Whitgift School is a private day school with limited boarding in South Croydon, London. Along with Trinity School of John Whitgift and Old Palace School it is owned by the Whitgift Foundation, a charitable trust. The school was previously a grammar school and direct grant grammar school, but the school's headmaster is now a member of the Headmasters' and Headmistresses' Conference.

History
Whitgift School was founded in 1596 by the Archbishop of Canterbury John Whitgift and opened in 1600 as part of the Whitgift Foundation which had the aim of building a hospital and school in Croydon for the "poor, needy and impotent people" from the parishes of Croydon and Lambeth. Originally located in North End, Croydon in 1931 it moved to its current site, Haling Park, which was once home to Lord Howard of Effingham, the Lord High Admiral of the Fleet sent against the Spanish Armada.

Originally a day school, boarding was introduced in 1992, and a boarding house was opened for the 2013–14 school year. Between 1871 and 1946 the school was known as Whitgift Grammar School, after which it relinquished its direct grant and became a fully independent school known as 'Whitgift School'.

Grounds and buildings

Whitgift is located in a  parkland site. The ship (a model of HMS Ark Royal, the flagship of Lord Howard of Effingham against the Spanish Armada) that features prominently on the top of the school hall is a reminder of the history of the site. Additions since the 400th anniversary of the school have been a maze in the founder's garden, an aviary, an enclosure for Prevost's squirrels, ponds and a sports complex.

The original buildings have been supplemented by many additions and improvements including a Music School and Concert Hall, an integrated facility for science, technology, art and design together with library and resource centres, a separate Lower School building, and a major new Sports and Conference Centre which was opened in February 2005. A new Art Department, Performing Arts Centre and a new Sixth Form Centre were completed in the middle of 2011.

Whitgift has a wide variety of animals, including peacocks on the grounds since the 1930s, and flamingos. In 2005 Sir David Attenborough visited the school to open the ponds, the enclosure of which also houses various waterfowl, including Hawaiian geese.

Admissions
Most boys are admitted to the school at the ages of 10 or 11 with smaller numbers of boys enter the school at 12, 13, 14 and 16. Entry is based on performance in entrance exams and interviews.

Education

Since 2005, Whitgift has offered the International Baccalaureate Diploma Programme to the Sixth Form as an optional alternative to A-Levels, as well as BTEC qualifications in sport and business studies.

Co-curricular activities
Whitgift School offers co-curricular activities within the school. This is reflected in the sporting facilities as well as an array of musical activities.

Combined Cadet Force
Whitgift has a combined cadet force. The school has partnerships with two local state schools St. Andrews C of E High School and Thomas More School, allowing their students to take part in CCF activities.

Sport
The school fields teams in a range of sports and has a sports and conference centre which hosts competitions the Health & Fitness Centre, a 55 station gym and group exercise studio are open to students and their families. The Women's GB Handball team has trained on occasions at the School as has the England Korfball steam.

In hockey Whitgift won the National Indoor Hockey Championships at Under 15 and Under 18 levels in 2011. The school also become national Under 18 golf champions for the first time in 2014 at Carnoustie. The first recorded cricket match held on the school ground occurred in 1898 when the school played University College School. From 2003 to 2011 the school ground hosted 12 List-A matches for county club Surrey.

Headmasters

Notable alumni

Former pupils of Whitgift are known as "Old Whitgiftians".

Notable staff
 Anthony Seldon, Head of Politics at Whitgift in the 1980s, head of Brighton College and Wellington College, biographer of contemporary British political figures.
 David Ward, cricket coach who, having retired from playing for Surrey, produced a stream of cricketers for the England team.
 Sir Dick White, Assistant Master in the 1930s, former Director General of MI5 and Head of MI6.

Southern Railway Schools Class
The Southern Railway V Class was known as the Schools Class because all 40 locomotives were named after public schools. "Whitgift", SR no. 916 and BR no. 30916, was built in 1934 and withdrawn in 1962. The Whitgift nameplate that was formerly mounted on the front driving wheel-splasher of the locomotive is now on display in the Raeburn Library in the school. Hornby Models created an OO gauge replica of the 916 Whitgift Schools Class locomotive. Whitgift has one on display in the Raeburn Library underneath the Whitgift nameplate from the 4–4–0 train.

References

External links
 Whitgift School website
 Whitgift School Profile Independent Schools Council
 A rendition of the school song, Carmen
 Old Whitgiftian Football Club
 Old Whitgiftian Association
 Old Whitgiftian Rugby Football Club

 Whitgift School Threatens Pupils

1596 establishments in England
Boarding schools in London
Church of England private schools in the Diocese of Southwark
Cricket grounds in London
Educational institutions established in the 1590s
Member schools of the Headmasters' and Headmistresses' Conference
Private schools in the London Borough of Croydon
International Baccalaureate schools in England
Private boys' schools in London
Surrey County Cricket Club grounds
Sports venues completed in 1898